National Highway 36 (NH 36) is a  National Highway in India that starts at Vikravandi and ends at Manamadurai. This highway runs entirely in the state of Tamil Nadu. It has a total length of 334 km. 

The highway runs through Panruti, Vadalur Anaikkarai, Kumbakonam, Thanjavur, Puthukottai, Thiruppathur and Sivagangai.

References

External links
 NH 36 on OpenStreetMap

National highways in India
National Highways in Tamil Nadu